Luiz dos Santos Luz (29 November 1909 – 27 August 1989) was a Brazilian football player. He played for the Brazil national team.

References

1909 births
1989 deaths
Brazilian footballers
Brazilian expatriate footballers
Brazil international footballers
Peñarol players
Grêmio Foot-Ball Porto Alegrense players
Expatriate footballers in Uruguay
1934 FIFA World Cup players
Association football defenders
Footballers from Porto Alegre